Karina Sisenova ( born 25 June 1996) is a Russian-Kazakh handballer who plays for HC Astrakhanochka and the Russian national team.

Achievements 
Russian Super League: 
Winner: 2016

References
   

1996 births
Living people
Sportspeople from Astrakhan
Russian female handball players  

http://www.astrahanochka.ru/index.php/component/joomsport/player/0/21?Itemid=0
https://rushandball.ru/players/4238